Hoya imbricata is a species of plant in the genus Hoya native to the Philippines and the Indonesian island of Sulawesi.

The succulent leaves are like upturned dinner plates, convex on the outer surface and concave on the inner, hugging the tree-trunk on which the plant grows, and overlapping or imbricate in the fashion of roof tiles. While other species of Hoya and the related genus Dischidia grow in a similar habit, Hoya imbricata is also unusual in having only one leaf per internode.

References

imbricata
Hoyas of the Philippines
Endemic flora of Sulawesi
Taxa named by Joseph Decaisne